Toxodera is the type genus of mantises in the family Toxoderidae, known for their stick mimicry. There are four confirmed species in Borneo restricted to old-growth forests and are considered to be rare. Species of the South-East Asian Toxoderini inhabit beneath the forest canopy. Not much is known regarding their ecology. Males however, are often attracted to lights. One species, Toxodera maxima, can reach 18 cm in total length.

Species
The Mantodea Species File lists:
Toxodera beieri Roy, 2009
Toxodera denticulata Serville, 1837 (slender flower mantis, synonym T. gigas Ouwens, 1913) - type species
Toxodera fimbriata Werner, 1930 (feathered mantis)
Toxodera hauseri Roy, 2009
Toxodera integrifolia Werner, 1925
Toxodera maculata Beier, 1913
Toxodera maxima Roy, 2009
Toxodera pfanneri Roy, 2009

References

External links

Toxoderidae
Insects of Southeast Asia
Mantodea genera